The 1991–92 BBL season was the 5th season of the British Basketball League (known as the Carlsberg League for sponsorship reasons) since its establishment in 1987. The season featured an increased number of teams with the additions of the Birmingham Bullets and Cheshire Jets. London Docklands changed their name to London Towers.

Kingston, coached by Kevin Cadle, stormed to success in every domestic competition they entered and completed a clean sweep of the four major competitions, which they had previously accomplished two years earlier. They claimed the Division One title and Play-off crown, were victorious in the League Trophy and the National Cup, whilst Coach Cadle and star player Alton Byrd were awarded as Coach and Player of the Year respectively.

Carlsberg League Division One (Tier 1)

Final standings

The play-offs

Quarter-finals 
(1) Kingston vs. (8) Birmingham Bullets

(2) Thames Valley Tigers vs. (7) Hemel Royals

(3) Worthing Bears vs. (6) Leicester City Riders

(4) London Towers vs. (5) Derby Bucks

Semi-finals

Final

National League Division 2 (Tier 2)

Final standings

National League Division 3 (Tier 3)

Final standings

Coca-Cola National Cup

Third Round

Quarter-finals

Semi-finals

Final

NatWest Trophy

Group stage 
North Group
Midlands Group
South Group

Kingston received a bye into the Semi-finals.

Semi-finals 
Manchester Giants vs. Leicester City Riders

Kingston vs. London Towers

Final

Seasonal awards 
 Most Valuable Player: Alton Byrd (Kingston)
 Coach of the Year: Kevin Cadle (Kingston)
 All-Star Team:
 Karl Brown (Leicester City Riders)
 Alton Byrd (Kingston)
 Alan Cunningham (Kingston)
 Bryan Heron (Worthing Bears)
 Larry Koretz (Birmingham Bullets)
 Nigel Lloyd (Thames Valley Tigers)
 Mike Obaseki (Thames Valley Tigers)
 David Peed (Thames Valley Tigers)
 Russ Saunders (Kingston)
 Peter Scantlebury (London Towers)

References 

British Basketball League seasons
1
British